Clive Royden Screech (born 15 May 1953) is a former Bishop of St Germans in the Diocese of Truro.

Screech was educated at Cotham Grammar School and King's College London. He was ordained in 1976 and was a curate at Hatcham followed by incumbencies at Nunhead, Addington and Camberwell (where he was rural dean
) before his ordination to the episcopate.

Screech has been married to Angela (née Waring) since 1980 and is a keen opera fan.

Styles
Roy Screech Esq (1953–1976)
The Revd Roy Screech (1976–2000)
The Rt Revd Roy Screech (2000—present)

References

1953 births
Alumni of King's College London
Associates of King's College London
21st-century Church of England bishops
Living people
Bishops of St Germans